Vladimir Nikolayevich Yesheyev (born 7 May 1958 in Zabaykalsky Krai) is a former archer from the Soviet Union.

Biography
He competed for the Soviet Union in the 1980 Summer Olympics held in Moscow, Soviet Union in the individual event where he finished in sixth place.  He missed the following Olympics due to the boycott but returned to compete in the 1988 Summer Olympics where he finished in third in the individual competition and fifth in the team event.  Four years later competing for the Unified team finishing eleventh in the individual event and eighth in the team event.

He is the President of Russian Archery Federation. The Russian archery team at the 2008 Summer Olympics in the team event brought back to Russia Bair Badënov's bronze (the next national Olympic bronze in archery after Yesheyev's).

After the 2022 Russian invasion of Ukraine, the World Archery executive board voted to remove the Russian and Belarusian national flags and anthems from all international tournaments, and not to have either country host their archery events. Though he was an executive board member, he was not invited to the discussion or vote.

References

 

1958 births
Living people
People from Ononsky District
Russian male archers
Soviet male archers
Olympic archers of the Soviet Union
Olympic archers of the Unified Team
Olympic bronze medalists for the Soviet Union
Archers at the 1980 Summer Olympics
Archers at the 1988 Summer Olympics
Archers at the 1992 Summer Olympics
Buryat sportspeople
Olympic medalists in archery
Asian Games medalists in archery
Archers at the 1994 Asian Games
Kazakhstani male archers
Medalists at the 1988 Summer Olympics
Asian Games bronze medalists for Kazakhstan
Medalists at the 1994 Asian Games
Sportspeople from Zabaykalsky Krai